Processing speed may refer to

 Cognitive processing speed
 Instructions per second, a measure of a computer's processing speed
 Clock speed, also known as processor speed